JC Latham (born February 8, 2003) is an American football offensive tackle for the Alabama Crimson Tide.

Career
Latham originally attended Catholic Memorial High School in Waukesha, Wisconsin before transferring to IMG Academy in Bradenton, Florida. He played offensive tackle and defensive end in high school. He was selected to play in the 2020 Under Armour All-America Game. A five star recruit, Latham committed to the University of Alabama to play college football.

Latham played in 14 games as a backup his true freshman year at Alabama in 2021. In 2022, he became the team's starting right tackle.

References

External links
Alabama Crimson Tide bio

Living people
Players of American football from Wisconsin
American football offensive tackles
Alabama Crimson Tide football players
Year of birth missing (living people)